The 1912 Ohio State Buckeyes football team represented Ohio State University in the 1912 college football season. 1912 was the year that Ohio State was accepted into the Western Conference, now known as the Big Ten Conference.

Schedule

Lettermen 
These are the Ohio State University lettermen of the 1912 season.

 Donald Barricklow
 Brooklyn Bridge
 Maurice Briggs
 Paul Carroll
 Boyd Cherry
 Samuel Funkhauser
 J.R. Geib
 W.I. Geissman
 Campbell Graf
 Watt Hobt
 Arthur Keifer
 Earl Maxwell
 James McClure
 Edward Morrisey
 Robert Pavey
 Arthur Raymond
 Lee Ryan
 Ralph Shafor
 Charles Snyder
 Byron Stover
 George Trautman
 Grant Ward

References

Ohio State
Ohio State Buckeyes football seasons
Ohio State Buckeyes football